Postal killings in various countries resulted in fatalities that have occurred on the properties of postal systems or related issues/events. The main sections are divided by countries. Events are listed in chronological order.

Australia 
 December 17, 1926, Adelaide: fired postal worker James Hannivan shot and wounded two employees at Adelaide General Post Office, before committing suicide by shooting himself in the head.
 December 8, 1987, Queen Street massacre, Melbourne: Frank Vitkovic, former law student, entered an office building on Queen Street at 4:20 p.m. with the intent to murder a former school friend and kill as many people as possible before taking his own life. In the ensuing shooting spree eight people were killed and five injured. At around 4:30 p.m. after the gun was wrestled from him, he jumped to his death from the 11th floor. Vitkovic's former friend did not work for a postal department, but for a credit union that was a tenant of the building. Most of the other floors were occupied by the offices of Australia Post and most of the victims were Australia Post office workers.

Canada 
 October 30, 1934, Quebec: Rosaire Bilodeau, ex-carrier of the Quebec postal service, drove five of his family members out into the woods, in two trips, and killed them. He then took 8 shots at postmaster Morin, senior mail clerk Moïse Jolicoeur, and divisional superintendent Oscar Fiset, killing Jolicoeur.

Iran 
 May 14, 2022, Ilam province: a former employee of the Mostazafan Foundation killed 3 workers and injured 5 more with a firearm. He later committed suicide.

United States 
August 13, 1970, Los Angeles, California: Harry Sendrow, 54, a postal supervisor, was shot in the back three times by Alfred Kellum, 41, whom Sendrow had sent home for being intoxicated. Five hours later Kellum was found unconscious and arrested. Police officers said he appeared to be intoxicated.
 March 22, 1975, Gadsden, Alabama: Floyd Davidson, a 47-year-old postal employee, was charged with two counts of first-degree murder in the fatal shooting of Gadsden Postmaster James M. Ford and a postal tour superintendent, Eldred Curtis McDonald.
November 4, 1980, New Orleans, Louisiana: Curtis Collins, a disgruntled postal worker, shot and killed his supervisor and wounded a security guard with a high-powered rifle, in a second-floor office of a federal building near the Superdome. A postal employee said Collins had received a letter of reprimand from the supervisor and slashed the tires on her car two days earlier. Collins was charged with murder and attempted murder.
 August 19, 1983, Johnston, South Carolina: Perry Smith, a resigned USPS employee, charged into the Johnston post office with a 12-gauge shotgun and began firing at workers in a hall, killing the postmaster and wounding two other employees.
 December 2, 1983, Anniston, Alabama: James Brooks, 53, entered the Anniston, Alabama post office with a .38-caliber pistol, killing the postmaster. Brooks then pursued his supervisor up the stairs and shot him twice, injuring him.
 March 6, 1985, Atlanta, Georgia: Steven Brownlee, a 12-year veteran of the postal service, opened fire on the night shift in the Atlanta main post office with a .22-caliber pistol, killing a supervisor and a coworker and wounding another coworker in a mail sorting area.
 November 15, 1985, Manitou, Oklahoma: Forrest Albert Reffner, 39, was at the Manitou post office to check his elderly mother's mail when 74-year-old Arvell "Pete" Conner, armed with a .38-caliber, began arguing with Reffner before shooting and killing him inside the main post office.
 August 20, 1986, Edmond, Oklahoma: Patrick Sherrill, a part-time letter carrier, fatally shot 14 employees and wounded six at the Edmond post office. He subsequently committed suicide. This is the deadliest workplace shooting in US history and gave rise to the American phrase "going postal".
 December 14, 1988, New Orleans, Louisiana: Warren Murphy entered the New Orleans postal facility with a 12-gauge shotgun hidden under his clothing. Later, during his work shift, after an incident with a supervisor, he reportedly went to the men's room and came out brandishing the shotgun. He then fatally shot his supervisor in the face. The fired shot reportedly wounded two other employees. After the shooting, he held his ex-girlfriend hostage. Two FBI SWAT agents were also reportedly wounded upon finding Warren Murphy in a supervisor's office. He eventually surrendered to the agents.
 August 10, 1989, Escondido, California: John Merlin Taylor killed his wife, then two colleagues and himself at Orange Glen post office.
 October 10, 1991: Ex-postal worker Joseph M. Harris killed his ex-supervisor and her boyfriend at their home in Wayne, New Jersey, then killed two former colleagues as they arrived at the Ridgewood, New Jersey post office where they all previously worked. According to "Today in Rotten History", Harris was initially armed with an Uzi, grenades and a "samurai sword", and was later arrested after a 4½-hour standoff with police, garbed in a ninja's outfit and gas mask. He was convicted of murder and sentenced to death.
 November 14, 1991, Royal Oak, Michigan: In the Royal Oak post office shootings, fired postal worker Thomas McIlvane killed four and wounded five before killing himself.
 June 3, 1992, Citrus Heights, California: Roy Barnes, a 60-year-old employee, went to the workroom floor at the Citrus Heights post office armed with a .22-caliber pistol and fatally shot himself in the heart in front of his coworkers.
 May 6, 1993, Dearborn, Michigan: Postal worker Larry Jasion killed one and wounded three others before killing himself at a post office garage.
 May 6, 1993, Dana Point, California: Mark Richard Hilbun, a former postal employee, killed his mother and her dog in their home. He then made his way to the post facility where he used to work and shot two postal workers, killing one and injuring the other. It was the beginning of a three-day rampage in which he injured several other people, prompted by Hilbun's dismissal for stalking another co-worker.
 May 4, 1994, Pittsburgh, Pennsylvania: Postal employee James A. Paulano was accidentally killed in a drive-by shooting.
 March 21, 1995, Montclair, New Jersey: Christopher Green, a former postal employee, killed four people, including two employees, and wounded a fifth at the Fairfield Street branch post office. While this is a postal killing, the primary motivation appears to have been debt payment, and there was no indication that the former employee was mentally disturbed as a result of his former postal work.
 July 10, 1995, City of Industry, California: 25-year postal clerk Bruce Clark punched his supervisor in the back of the head following an argument at the City of Industry mail processing center and left the work area. About ten minutes later, he returned with a brown paper bag. Upon being asked by his supervisor what was in the bag, Clark reportedly pulled out a .38 revolver and shot the supervisor twice at close range, once in the upper body and once in the face, killing him. Two employees reportedly took the gun away from Clark and held him until police arrived. Seventy-five postal employees reportedly witnessed the shooting.
 December 19, 1996, Las Vegas, Nevada: Former employee Charles Jennings went to the parking lot at the Las Vegas postal facility and fatally shot a labor relations specialist. Mr. Jennings reportedly indicated in his statement to investigators that the victim struggled to take the gun away from him and was shot in the process.
 September 2, 1997, Miami Beach, Florida: 21-year postal employee Jesus Antonio Tamayo shot his ex-wife and friend, who were waiting in line, then killed himself.
 December 20, 1997, Milwaukee, Wisconsin: Anthony Deculit killed a coworker and wounded a supervisor and another coworker with a 9 mm pistol before killing himself.
 January 30, 2006, Goleta, California: Former mail processor Jennifer San Marco, 44, killed six employees (five immediately, another died later). A seventh victim, a former neighbor, was killed first. San Marco committed suicide at the sorting facility.
 April 4, 2006, Baker City, Oregon: While on duty, Grant Gallaher, a letter carrier for 13 years, reportedly went home and got his .357 Magnum revolver and drove to the city post office with the intention of killing the postmaster. Arriving at the parking lot, he ran over his supervisor several times. After unsuccessfully searching the building for the postmaster, he returned to the parking lot and shot his supervisor several times at close range, ostensibly to ensure she was dead. He reportedly then fired three bullets at the windshield of her car and three more into the hood.
 November 28, 2006, San Francisco, California: 39-year-old Julius Kevin Tartt, an 18-year employee working at the Napoleon Street Carrier Annex in San Francisco, went to his supervisor's residence armed with a revolver and shot her in the back of the head outside her house. He then reportedly left the scene and fatally shot himself in the head the following day. Early in the investigation, homicide investigators examined disputes between Tartt and his supervisor, including what one police official referred to as a discipline issue. A homicide official stated that there were indications that Tartt was dissatisfied with work and with the supervisor.
 April 29, 2014, Kennesaw, Georgia: Geddy Kramer, 19, shot and wounded six coworkers at a FedEx facility with a 5-shot, 12-gauge Mossberg 930 Security semi-automatic shotgun before committing suicide.
 March 23, 2017, Muncie, Indiana: A suspect who had been involved in a police pursuit was shot by police after crashing through a post office gate, then driving towards police officers.
 June 14, 2017, San Francisco, California: 38-year-old employee Jimmy Lam killed 3 coworkers at a UPS facility before killing himself as police arrived. Two others were shot and injured, and three were wounded indirectly.
 December 23, 2017, Dublin, Ohio: 24-year-old DeShaune Stewart, in response to his pending dismissal, shot and killed his supervisor and then shoved the postmaster to the ground in a parking lot, causing fatal head trauma.
 April 15, 2021, Indianapolis, Indiana: 19-year-old Brandon Scott Hole killed eight of his former coworkers at a FedEx facility before committing suicide.
 October 12, 2021, Memphis, Tennessee 28-year-old Johntra Haley, a USPS city carrier assistant, killed two of his coworkers and himself at the USPS East Lamar carrier annex facility.
 October 20, 2022, Chattanooga, Tennessee: 27-year-old Brian Simmons, a USPS worker, shot and killed his supervisor. Simmons then fled the scene and crashed into a nail salon and Fedex. Simmons was found dead inside of his crashed truck from a self-inflicted gunshot wound.

See also
Going postal
Son of Sam

References 

Mass shootings
United States Postal Service
Postal killings
Killings